XHOT-FM is a radio station on 97.7 FM in Xalapa, Veracruz. It is owned by Avanradio and is known as La Máquina 97.7.

History
XHOT received its concession on April 14, 1987. It was originally owned by Octavio Tena Álvarez del Castillo.

References

External links
La Maquina 97.7 Facebook

Radio stations in Veracruz